The Union of Insurance Employees (VvL) is a trade union representing workers in the insurance industry in Finland.

The union was founded in 1945, and affiliated to the Confederation of Salaried Employees (TVK). The TVK went bankrupt in 1992, and the union transferred to the Finnish Confederation of Professionals. By 1998, it had 11,800 members.

On 1 January 2021, the union merged into Trade Union Pro.

References

External links

Trade unions established in 1945
Trade unions disestablished in 2021
Trade unions in Finland
Insurance industry trade unions